Bibliographie is a circa  sport climbing route on a limestone cliff on the southern face of Céüse mountain, near Gap and Sigoyer, in France. The route was bolted in 2009 by Ethan Pringle, and was first ascended by Alexander Megos on 5 August 2020.

History
Bibliographie was bolted by the American climber Ethan Pringle in 2009, and it lies just a few metres to the right of Chris Sharma's famous 2001 Realization/Biography route. Megos first started working on the route in June 2017, and was still unsuccessful after a four-week visit in September of that year. In June 2018, after 16 days of work, he freed the  route Perfecto Mundo, in Margalef, and decided to go straight to Céüse, but again without success. In 2019, he concentrated primarily on climbing competitions and only spent around three days in Céüse. During the COVID-19 pandemic, all climbing competitions were canceled, so Megos refocused on Bibliographie again. 

On the last day of a trip to the crag, and after having fallen lower down on the route, Megos made the first free ascent of Bibliographie on 5 August 2020.  His work on the route was captured in his 2020 climbing film Rotpunkt, about the history of modern German sport climbing.

Grade
At the time, Megos told Rock & Ice that grading such a route was particularly hard given he started with no beta, and had no other opinions to rely on; he added: "I am very curious about what the future of the route will look like, and grateful for other people’s opinions". 

Other climbers unsuccessfully attempted Bibliographie including Sébastien Bouin, Jakob Schubert, Stefano Ghisolfi and Dave Graham. Megos consulted and publically agreed with Ghisolfi, making  the accepted grade for Bibliographie; the fifth-ever climbing route to have such a grade.

Ascents 
Bibliographie has been ascended by:
 1st Alexander Megos, 5 August 2020.
 2nd Stefano Ghisolfi, August 2021.
 3rd Sean Bailey, September 2021.

See also

 History of rock climbing
 List of first ascents (sport climbing)
 Silence, first climb in the world with a potential grade of 
 La Dura Dura, second climb in the world to be graded 
 Realization/Biographie, first climb in the world with a consensus grade of 
 Action Directe, first climb in the world with a consensus grade of 
 Hubble, first climb in the world with a consensus grade of

References

External links
VIDEO: Watch Alex Megos Red Point Film Rotpunkt, a 2020 film that includes Megos' on Bibliographie, Gripped Magazine (February 2020)
VIDEO:See the actual Holds on Bibliographie 5.15d in France, Gripped Magazine (August 2021)
VIDEO:Watch Historical Repeat of “5.15d” That Ended With Downgrade to 5.15c, Gripped Magazine (December 2021)

Climbing routes
Climbing areas of France
Sport in Hautes-Alpes